National Highway 32 (NH 32) is a National Highway in India. It starts from Chennai and terminates at Thoothukudi. It is also known as East Coast Road.

The highway is extended up to Thoothukudi as per the notification on 5 December 2017.

Route
The highway starting from its junction with NH-48 near Chennai connecting Chengalpattu, Tindivanam, Puducherry, Cuddalore, Chidambaram, Karaikal, Nagapattinam, Velankanni, Thiruthuraipoondi, Muthupettai, Adirampattinam, Manamelkudi, Thondi, Devipattinam, Ramanathapuram bypass, Thiruppullani, Keelakarai, Ervadi, Valinokkam, Sayalgudi, Vembar, Vaippar, Kulathur, Veppalodai, Pattina, Maruthur and terminating at its junction with NH-44 near Thoothukudi.

Junctions

  Terminal near Chennai.
  near Chengalpattu
  near Tindivanam
  near Tindivanam
  near Puducherry
  near Puducherry
  near Cuddalore
  near Chidambaram
  near Sirkazhi 
  near Nagapattinam
  near Thiruthuraipoondi
  near Tondi
  near Devipattinam
  near Ramanathapuram
  Terminal near Thoothukudi

See also 

 List of National Highways in India
 List of National Highways in India by state

References

External links
 NH 32 on OpenStreetMap

National highways in India
National Highways in Tamil Nadu
Transport in Chennai
Transport in Thoothukudi
National Highways in Puducherry